Michel Drucker, CQ (born 12 September 1942 in Vire) is a popular French journalist and TV host. He has been on screen for so long on various shows and different networks, both public and private, that he once said that some people joked that he was included in the price of their TV sets.

Drucker's younger brother, Jacques, is a doctor, and his older brother, Jean, was a television executive. He started a journalistic career in 1965 at the ORTF as sports reporter and commentator. Although he kept doing live coverage of major soccer matches until 1986, he soon turned to hosting variety shows, such as Champs-Élysées on Antenne 2 in the 1980s, then Stars 90 on TF1 in the 1990s, then finally Vivement dimanche on France 2 every Sunday afternoon since 1998.

Drucker is known for his polite, toned-down attitude towards show-business stars, and is best known outside France for the incident between Serge Gainsbourg and American singer Whitney Houston on the television programme,  Champs-Élysées.

Personal life
Drucker is Jewish. His father, Abraham Drucker, was a Jewish immigrant who arrived in France in 1925 to study medicine.

Drucker is married to French actress Dany Saval and is an uncle of Léa Drucker, an actress, and Marie Drucker, a telejournalist on France 2.

Filmography

Honours

National honours 
  : 
 Officer of the National Order of the Legion of Honour (1994)
 Knight of the Ordre des Arts et des Lettres (1984)

Foreign honours 
  : 
  : Knight (2001), now Officer (2010) of the National Order of Quebec

References

External links

 Vivement Dimanche
 Michel Drucker on the website on France 2 TV 
 Michel Drucker biographie (in French)

1942 births
Living people
People from Vire
20th-century French Jews
20th-century French journalists
French television presenters
Chevaliers of the Légion d'honneur
Officers of the National Order of Quebec
Knights of the National Order of Quebec
French male non-fiction writers
Helicopter pilots